The Plattberg (also Blattberg) is a mountain in the southern chain of the Ammergau Alps. Its highest point is also called the Hochschrutte and reaches a height of  
The Plattberg lies north of Lähn and can be climbed from Lähn (railway station on the Außerfern Railway) or, on a more strenuous and trackless route from the lake of Plansee via the Wiesjoch col. The ascent of the mountain can be done as part of a ridge walk from or to the Daniel. The nearby peak of Großes fuitjöchl (2,196 m) is also a popular climb in winter for skiers or snowshoers.

Literature and external links 

 Dieter Seibert: AVF Allgäuer Alpen und Ammergauer Alpen, Rother Verlag, Munich, 2004, 

Two-thousanders of Austria
Mountains of Tyrol (state)
Mountains of the Alps
Ammergau Alps